Karimabad-e Tehranchi (also Romanized as Karīmābād-e Tehrānchī; also known as Karīmābādād-e Qavām and Karīmābādād-e Tehrānchī) is a village in Qaleh Now Rural District, Qaleh Now District, Ray County, Tehran Province, Iran. At the 2006 census, its population was 804, in 179 families.

References 

Populated places in Ray County, Iran